Logan is an American magazine for young people with disabilities.

History
Logan magazine was first published in 2006. The magazine was created by Logan Olson after she concluded "the world needs a magazine for young women with disabilities". The headquarters of the magazine is in Spokane, Washington.

Coverage
Logan'''s articles are targeted towards young adults living with disabilities. The magazine features fashion, easy-to-handle beauty products, college & career resources, and lifestyle articles.

The magazine also profiles successful young men and women with disabilities, as well as celebrity interviews, including Ginny Owens, Bethany Hamilton, and Adam Morrison to provide inspirational testimonies and advice on life.

Olson has said that she created the magazine to offer readers reassurance that they are not alone, a feeling she longed for when she was recovering from surgery.

References

External links
 Logan Magazine -Official website
 Logan's Launch - article discussing launch of Logan Magazine
 Video Journal of Logan -shows launch of Logan'' Magazine

Bimonthly magazines published in the United States
Disability publications
Lifestyle magazines published in the United States
Magazines established in 2006
Magazines published in Washington (state)
Mass media in Spokane, Washington
Teen magazines
Women's magazines published in the United States